Line Friends (stylized as LINE FRIENDS) are featured characters, invented by South Korean designer Kang Byeong Mok, based on the stickers from diverse applications of the South Korean internet search giant Naver Corporation and the Japanese messaging app Line. Released in 2015, the characters are used in various products, animations, games, cafes, hotels and theme parks. In addition to its online presence, physical stores featuring Line Friends have opened in cities around the world. The brand is currently managed by its subsidiary Line Friends Corporation since 2015.

Characters 

The original Line characters were created by South Korean designer Kang Byeongmok, or also known as "Mogi" in 2011.

Brown & Friends 
 Cony, Brown, Moon and James (added in 2011)
 Boss, Jessica and Sally (added in 2013)
 Leonard and Edward (added in 2014)
Brown's younger sister Choco and her best friend Pangyo (added in 2016)
 Sally's friends Elly, Louie and Ari (added in 2020)

Character information 
 Brown: Silent but has a warm heart. His expressionless face is charming, as a friend of everyone who expresses his mind more than words. He seems he doesn't care much. But, he has a shoulder to share and has a big heart to hear you. He loves Cony who is full of energy, and always there for his little sister Choco.
 Cony: She is bright, cheerful and full of passion. She gets super excited when she's with her beloved Brown. Cony's always curious and likes challenging new things, so she often make her friends surprised.
 Sally: With her unexpected charm, cute little Sally brings joy to her friends with full of bright and wild ideas. Don't be fooled by her cuteness, she might reveal the other side of her you've never expected!
 Choco: Sweet, lovely Choco who loves fashion and sweets. She is shy like her brother Brown, but once you get to know her, she gets along well even with Brown's friends.
 Moon: A funny guy whose face looks just like the full moon. No one knows where he came from, but he brings cheerful laughter to his friends with his wit and great humor.
 Leonard: Sentimental Leonard likes to sing along with the sound of rain. He also loves to hang out with Sally and Edward, the so-called tiny little trio.
 James: Beautiful blonde haired James who loves himself the most. He may seem cool and chic, but to tell the truth, he's actually delicate and fragile.
 Boss: Loud and wild Boss is an ordinary salaryman. He shows up out of nowhere and gives good laughs to people.
 Edward: Edward is brilliant and always curious. He's also a racer who has a thirst for speed and an adventurer who dreams of the day becoming a butterfly!
 Jessica: Smart and sassy Jessica. She always gives clear and punchy answers for friends who wants to chat about things.
 Pangyo: Our sluggish friend Pangyo, who likes to think and make interesting stuff. He is always content and has a smile on his face.

BT21 

BT21 is the first presentation from FRIENDS CREATORS, a project formed to create new characters for the Line Friends series. South Korean boy group BTS was the first artist of this project, and the main theme of the project is to show the connection between BTS and Line Friends in terms of popularity in the world. It comprises eight special characters created by South Korean boy group BTS. The character designs were based on original ideas and sketches by the group's members. Videos of BTS designing BT21 were uploaded to the official BT21 channel on YouTube.

The name BT21 is a combination of the group's name BTS and the 21st Century. Member Suga commented that the name should represent both BTS and the 21st Century so they would live for the next 100 years.

BT21 was officially launched by Line Friends in October 2017.

Character information 

Koya was created by RM. He is a baby blue koala with a violet nose and removable ears that fall off when he is shocked or surprised. Described as a deep thinker, Koya lives in the Eucalyptus forest and is always asleep. 
RJ was created by Jin. He is a kind, loving, and compassionate white alpaca who always wears a red scarf. When it is cold, he sometimes puts on a light gray parka. RJ originated from Machu Picchu, hates shaving his fur, and loves cooking and eating.
Shooky was created by Suga. His character is an extremely savage, mischievous, little chocolate chip cookie who is afraid of milk. He leads a cookie team called the Crunchy Squad.
Mang was created by J-Hope. His species is unknown as his identity is kept hidden by the horse-faced mask with a heart-shaped nose that he always wears. Mang loves to dance.
Chimmy was created by Jimin. His character has been described as a "passionate" puppy whose tongue is always hanging out. Chimmy wears a yellow hoodie and loves to play the harmonica. He does not remember his past.
Tata was created by V. He is a curious crown prince from Planet BT who spreads love across the universe. He has supernatural powers; a stretchy, hyper-elastic body; a red heart-shaped head atop a blue body with yellow polka-dots.
Cooky was created by Jungkook. His character is a cute, but tough pink bunny with one bold eyebrow and white heart-shaped tail who wants to be strong and loves his body "like a temple". He loves boxing.
Van is Tata's AI robot. Half of his body is gray with an "X" eye, and the other half is white with an "O" eye. He is BT21's protector and was created by RM to represent BTS' fandom, A.R.M.Y.

ROY6

ROY6 is a character brand created by Chinese Millennial's idol Roy Wang, in collaboration with global character brand, Line Friends. China's first and world's second FRIENDS CREATORS project, Roy Wang participated in every step, starting from initial sketches and storytelling to product planning. Videos of Roy Wang designing ROY6 are uploaded on the roy6 YouTube Channel.

ROY6 was officially released by Line Friends in November 2018.

Character information 

Royan is a lion-looking sun descended upon earth from the sky, gives splendid sunlight to the people with his shiny mane.
Eddy simply loves being next to someone who needs courage and gives them a surprise hug
Long Long is a young and small dragon with an iridescent fin, Long Long brings luck to people and summons meteor showers with his magic wand.
Loudy is a chatty cloud, admires the earth more than the sky.
T-2000 is a clumsy but adorable robot, T-2000 shows people the future, which they hope to see on the screen.
Baobao Tree is a mysterious wish-bearing tree, Baobao provides a place of rest for everyone.

ChiChi 
Nexon Racing Game "Kart Rider Rush Plus," BlackPink Jisoo, and Line Friends designed together this character. Chichi is a rabbit character based on Jisoo's nickname "Tuttle Rabbit Kim," which is well known to fans.

Anime 

Two anime series, LINE OFFLINE and LINE TOWN, were produced in 2013, picturing the Line Friends as employees for the fictional Line Corporation.

Line Offline 
Line Offline is an animated series created by Shogakukan Productions, based on salaryman characters working at "Line Corporation". All 114 episodes last about three minutes. The series was aired from January 8, 2013, to October 1, 2013.

The episodes of Line Offline are not connected to each other. The idea behind the series is to represent the ordinary life of company employees (in this case Line's employees, hence the name "Line Offline"), in which every small problem could lead to awkward and hilarious situations that require some effort in order to restore the status quo.

Most characters from Line Offline are part of Line's universe (the characters who are shown in the animated series are also Line Friends, and can be seen by users in Line Messaging App and used as emoticons).

Episodes

Line Town

Characters 
 Cony (voiced by Aki Kanada in the Japanese dub and Sarah Hauser in the English dub) is a rabbit with a pleasant personality. She likes to go on a diet.
 Brown is a Canadian bear who likes salmon a lot. He is silent, and has a crush on Cony. He becomes scary when he gets angry, and notes appears when he feels good.
 Moon (voiced by Toshiyuki Morikawa in the Japanese dub and Michael Pizzuto in the English dub) is a manjū-shaped-headed man who loves the moon. His interest is playing video games. He sometimes tricks his friends when he is bored. His father is an adventurer.
 James (voiced by Yūto Kazama in the Japanese dub and Daniel Garcia in the English dub) is a narcissist with long, blonde hair. He is obsessed with his appearance, and is afraid of high places.
 Jessica (voice by Sachi Kokuryu in the Japanese dub and Catherine Fu in the English dub) is a cat who is knowledgeable about fashion and loves to cook a lot. She is Cony's best friend.
 Sally (voiced by Atsuko Enomoto in the Japanese dub and Catherine Fu in the English dub) is a chick who usually helps her friends. She often stays in the windmill tree hollow in the park. She likes karaoke.
 Boss/Mister (voiced by Nobuo Tobita in the Japanese dub and Michael Pizzuto in the English dub) is an almost completely bald middle-aged man with glasses. He appears as many different identities in every episode.
 Leonard (voiced by Megumi Han in the Japanese dub and Jesse McCartney in the English dub) is a little frog boy that looks up to Moon. He refers to Moon as an "elder brother". ("Longing For")
 Edward is a green caterpillar with a cap who often stays by Sally's side.
 Cob Taro (voiced by Nobuo Tobita) is a cobra with a Mohawk hairstyle and an eye patch that escaped from the zoo and now has a part-time job at the burger shop.
 Dorothy (voiced by Chie Kōjiro) is a hen who likes to take gossips. Cony fears her.
 Mr. Kinoko (voiced by Mitsuru Ogata) is a beaver who owns a mushroom dish restaurant and can cook mushroom dishes very well. Kinoko is the Japanese word for mushrooms.

Episodes

Theme Songs

Opening 
 "AIUEOngaku" by Greeeen

Ending 
 "Millefeuille Nights" by Shōko Nakagawa
 "Marshmallow" by Kerakera

Line Rangers 
Line Rangers is an animated mini series created to tie-in with the Line Rangers Mobile Game, which featured the Line character. It originally premiered as shorts on the Line Global YouTube Channel in 2015. It  aired as a mini series on Cartoon Network Korea  in July 2018. An English dubbed version went up on Amazon Prime in North America on July 20, 2018.

Brown & Friends 
On December 12, 2019, Netflix collaborate with Line Friends to create an original animated series based on the characters from Brown & Friends. All the episodes from the first season, including 3 special episodes based on seasonal occasions, such as Halloween and Christmas, released on December 29, 2022.

Products 
 Friends (smart speaker) – with Brown and Sally as the speaker's appearance
 LINE FRIENDS x Sailor (fountain pens) - Sailor Pens produces fountain pens of Brown and Sally in their Pro Gear Slim size with 14K gold nib choices of EF, F, MF, M, and B. The pens are exclusive to the North America market and were announced in July 2022.

Physical stores 
Apart from its online store, physical stores have been opened in Hong Kong (Hysan Place), Chengdu (Sino-Ocean Taikoo Li), Nanjing (Katherine Park), and New York City (Times Square).

The popularity of Line Friends in China surged in 2016. During that one year, six physical storefronts were opened. At one time, there were as many as twelve of them in different cities in China. As their segment of the market became increasingly crowded, however, Line Friends began to phase out its physical presence in China by closing down shops. As of May 2021, only the Chengdu and Nanjing stores remained open.

Collaborations 
On November 21, 2019, it was announced on the official Brawl Stars YouTube channel that Brawl Stars would collaborate with Line Friends, adding new skins based on Line Friends characters.

See also 
 Line
 KakaoTalk
 Kakao Friends

References

External links 
 Official website
 Online store
 BT21 official website

Naver Corporation
South Korean brands
Emoticons
Toy brands
Advertising characters
Fictional characters introduced in 2011
2013 anime television series debuts